Büyükkumla is a neighborhood of Gemlik district in Bursa Province, Turkey.

Geography 
It is 33 km from Bursa and 8 km from Gemlik.

Population

References 

Villages in Gemlik District